HD 188385 is an A-type star in the equatorial constellation of Aquila.

References

External links
 HR 7589
 Image HD 188385

Aquila (constellation)
188385
A-type main-sequence stars
7589
097970
Durchmusterung objects